Naazim Richardson (died 24 July 2020) was an American boxing trainer from Philadelphia. Richardson is most notable for training Bernard Hopkins and "Sugar" Shane Mosley, in addition to Steve Cunningham and Karl Dargan. He is also known for catching Antonio Margarito with plaster knuckle pads in his hand wraps prior to Margarito's fight with Mosley. This led to Margarito's one-year suspension from boxing.

Early life
Richardson was raised in Philadelphia, Pennsylvania, and left home when he was 14. He was jailed as a teenager. According to The New York Times, "Boxing took Richardson from the streets that almost swallowed him in north Philadelphia, gave him energy and purpose." He was a head trainer in the Concrete Jungle in Philadelphia, and was also a trainer in several gyms across Philadelphia.  Richardson worked under Bouie Fisher for a while.  His son Rock Allen was a boxer prior to a car accident.

Career
A devout Muslim, Richardson was often acknowledged as "Brother" Naazim. In 2007, Richardson suffered a stroke that temporarily left him unable to walk or speak.

Soon after returning to boxing, Richardson became "Sugar" Shane Mosley's trainer for three of the biggest fights of the boxer's career: his win over Antonio Margarito and his losses to Floyd Mayweather Jr. and Manny Pacquiao.

Notable fighters trained or advised by Richardson 
Bernard Hopkins
Shane Mosley
Karl Dargan (nephew of Naazim Richardson) 
Badr Hari
Yusaf Mack (worked the corner)
Sergio Martinez (corner adviser for fight vs. Julio César Chávez Jr.)
Steve Cunningham

References

External links
 

Year of birth missing
2020 deaths
Boxers from Philadelphia
African-American Muslims
American Muslims
American boxing trainers
American male boxers